WNEC-FM (91.7 FM) is a radio station licensed to serve Henniker, New Hampshire.  The station is owned by New England College.  It airs a college radio format.

The station has been assigned the WNEC-FM call letters by the Federal Communications Commission since November 2, 1970. The station signed on February 9, 1971.

References

External links

NEC-FM
NEC-FM
Merrimack County, New Hampshire
Radio stations established in 1971
New England College